Kim Jung-eun's Chocolate was a South Korean late-night television music program which began airing on March 11, 2008 on Tuesday nights at 12:35am on SBS replacing Lee Juk's Music Space. It was then moved to Wednesday nights at 12:30am, Saturday nights at 12:10am, and now Sunday nights at 12:10am. It is hosted by famed actress, Kim Jung-eun, who starred in highly rated dramas such as Lovers in Paris and its sequel, Lovers. It aired its 3rd anniversary as its final episode on March 20, 2011.

Format 
Each episode at least one guest will perform on the show, as well as a conversation with host, Kim Jung-eun. A section of the stage was dedicated to "Just married couples", which would be introduced. At the end of the show, a segment called Sweet Recipe (달콤한 레시피) was presented by Kim Jung-eun, where she would talk about special life lessons. Both have been discontinued as of the 2009 Spring revamp. As part of the revamp, the show was moved to Saturdays at 12:10am to avoid competition with MBC's Music Travel, La, La, La (음악여행 라라라), and featured a new set and new segments Genre Stars Best of the Best All Come Out Number 1 Festival (장르별 최강자 총출동 No.1 Festival), which featured a "competition" between the guests of that night's theme (i.e. Rock, Hip-Hop, Ballad), and Hot Choco Concert (Hot Choco 콘서트) which was a special performance by a guest. Between performances, Kim Jung-eun would also have conversations with the guests and Q&A sessions. Those two segments were abandoned after weeks and were replaced with more performances and a Honest Speed Q&A (솔직담백 스피드 Q&A) segment. As of July 4, 2010, the program moved to Sunday nights at 12:10am.

List of episodes

2008

2009

2010

2011

Similar Programs 
SBS Jung Jae-hyung & Lee Hyo-ri's You and I
KBS Yu Hee-yeol's Sketchbook
MBC Beautiful Concert (아름다운 콘서트)

Notes

References

External links 
 Kim Jung-eun's Chocolate Official Homepage 

Seoul Broadcasting System original programming
South Korean music television shows
2008 South Korean television series debuts
2011 South Korean television series endings
2010s South Korean television series
Korean-language television shows